Cinema16 is a small British DVD company who release "classic & award winning short films on DVD".

The compilations they release feature short films from famous directors such as Christopher Nolan, Tim Burton, Ridley Scott, Guillermo del Toro, Jean-Luc Godard, Mike Leigh and George Lucas, as well as work by less well known names. Most of the films also feature commentary tracks, usually by the director.

Releases
Cinema16 have so far released five DVDs:

List of films
The five releases have included a total of 68 short films by 67 directors. The films are:

References

External links
Cinema16 website
Articles about Cinema16 from around the world

Home video distributors